Charles Faulkner (born January 12, 1952) is an American practitioner of neuro-linguistic programming (NLP), life coach, motivational speaker, trader and author.

He has authored a number of books and audio tapes on NLP, which is largely considered a pseudoscience

Faulkner is profiled in the book The New Market Wizards by Jack D. Schwager.

Biography 

However, in 1981, Faulkner discovered a book about neuro-linguistic programming called The Structure of Magic I: A Book About Language and Therapy by Richard Bandler and John Grinder. The book's methodology described ways of affecting immediate and positive life changes by reprogramming speech, movement and thought patterns. That moment was a major turning point for Faulkner, as he understood that "if you could get to the root of the crucial relationship between language and beliefs, then you could change everything." Upon the realization that Bandler and Grinder were developing innovations in areas where Northwestern University had not yet "cracked the code," Faulkner began NLP training. By 1987, he was a certified NLP trainer. Today, Faulkner describes Grinder and Bandler as having been at least 10 years ahead of their time.

Eventually, Faulkner found his niche within NLP when he began developing decision-making strategy models based on the thought-patterns and behaviors of highly successful people. He mapped strategies for physicians, international negotiators and accelerated learners. He began to take a particular interest in studying the behavior of top traders in 1987 when a bond trader asked him if NLP could be used in the stock market. In 1990 after years of observing the decision-making strategies of successful traders such as Richard Dennis, Pete Steidlmayer, Jim Rogers, Paul Tudor Jones and Tom Baldwin, Faulkner decided to become a trader, himself. His first trade in 1992 was a failure; however, he did succeed in closing the year at a profit. Within three years, Faulkner's trading skills had improved enough that, author, Jack D. Schwager included his profile in The New Market Wizards: Conversations with America's Top Traders.

In the late 1990s, Faulkner decided to live in England, where he felt the economy would be more stable. He, along with other NLP trainers, has modeled successful strategies for overcoming challenges in a wide range of industries including rehabilitation, finance, medicine, sports, and bereavement, as well as others. As of 2008, Faulkner is a resident of Kingston-Upon-Thames, UK, where he serves as Director of Programs for NLP Comprehensive. and as Visiting Senior Fellow to the University of Surrey School of Management.

Career 
Faulkner studied NLP with its co-founders. By blending his expertise in Ericksonian hypnosis (the foundation for NLP) with a wide array of cognitive-linguistic disciplines, as well as the Rogerian approach and Gestalt therapy, Charles Faulkner developed a unique system of modeling which he subsequently contributed to the field of NLP. In particular, Faulkner applies his modeling expertise to develop success strategies, taught internationally.

Charles Faulkner has given instruction at most of the major NLP training institutes, in both the Practitioner and Master Practitioner programs. In the mid-to-late 1980s, Faulkner was involved in learning and mapping NLP's early models such as Sub-modalities, Belief change, Sleight-of-mouth, and the Imperative Self. In 1986 and 1987, he was editor of The NLP Connection, the journal for the National Association of NLP. During the two years that followed, he served as executive director of NLP Comprehensive.

As of 2008, he has authored and co-authored 10 books (see Published works), one of which is NLP: The New Technology of Achievement, the number one selling NLP book on Amazon.com.

Neurolinguistic Programming

Early NLP Models 
Faulkner's numerous contributions to the field of NLP began in 1984 with his modeling of Accelerated Learning, to pioneer more efficient and effective learning strategies. He taught this model together with NLP, to a group of teachers in Japan that same year. The result of this work was the founding of Learning How to Learn. Upon returning to the U.S. in 1985, he modeled the Metaphors of Identity. This model states that an individual's strategies and behavior patterns are informed by deeply structured metaphors for life, self, desired outcomes and challenges. By adopting new metaphors, an individual can create new pathways to transformation.

The academic research of cognitive linguists George Lakoff and Mark Johnson and Faulkner's experience with Metaphors support his hypothesis that cognitive processes are mostly metaphoric, and unconscious. Hence, conscious desires with functional qualities have parallel metaphors that sustain them. Twenty years later, Faulkner would write about this phenomenon in a two-part article entitled "Outcomes, Decisions & 'Levels' of Meaning." In the years that followed, Faulkner continued to develop additional models, such as Physician Decision Strategies in 1986, Futures Trading in 1987, and finally System Structure (a simultaneous strategies model) in 1990.

Modeler 
In the 1990s, Faulkner honed his expertise as a modeler. He completed Perpetual Cybernetics, which differentiated the seven "worlds of subjective experience" that NLP uses as a basis for its presuppositions and techniques. In 1993, together with golf pro Mark Staples, he co-founded E.P.I.C Golf by modeling the internal and external behavior patterns of outstanding golfers. Later that same year, Faulkner co-authored and starred in the video NLP in Action and in 1994 he co-authored a book with Robert McDonald, entitled Success Mastery with NLP, based on his work modeling 'flow states' and the behavior of exceptional achievers. He continued to develop Perpetual Cybernetics in conjunction with his Living Myths & Metaphors work to arrive at one, single, unified model: the Metaphors of Perception. This work subsequently spawned several more models, including: Worlds Within a Word, Rhythms of Time (1995), and Meta-Patterns (1996).

In 2003, Faulkner co-authored with Steve Andreas to write NLP: The New Technology of Achievement. In the book, they write, “Lengthy struggle without success is a sign that what we’re doing isn’t working. It’s time to do something else, anything else. It’s time to realize that pain, struggle, suffering and waiting are signs that it’s time for another approach…." The following year, he attended the NLP Conference and Festival at the University of Bristol, England. There Faulkner presented "Awakening to the Social – An Introduction to Irresistible Influence." The following year he presented "Expository Cartography," an introduction to advanced mind mapping techniques that could be used to disengage habitual biases and systematically enrich any model including the more complex ones such as the four-quadrant model of Ken Wilber. In 2006 at the NLP Conference in London, he presented  "Training is for Dogs and Horses", a bold challenge to the limiting approach in which NLP had previously been taught. In September 2007 Faulkner lectured at the London School of Economics to The Society for Organisational Learning(SOL-UK).

Applications in Stock Trading 
Faulkner became a futures trader in the early 1990s as a way to apply his NLP-based models for peak performance. He encouraged fellow traders who were breaking into the industry to use positive statements when journaling. Otherwise, a trader may wind up unconsciously setting in negative trading patterns. He said in a Futures (magazine) article, "When you recall something, you reinforce it."
He is interviewed at length about his studies of futures traders in numerous books including:  The New Market Wizards (1992), by Jack Schwager;  The Outer Game of Trading (1994), by Robert Koppel & Howard Abell; and  The Intuitive Trader (1996), by Robert Koppel; and Trend Following (2004), by Michael Covel. Three years later, Faulkner contributed a foreword to the paperback edition of Trend Following.

"The Intuitive Trader" 
In Chapter Five of The Intuitive Trader, by Robert Koppel, Charles Faulkner shares his insights on how to develop the intuition needed to be a successful trader. He defines intuition as “getting a solution and not knowing how you got there” and “an insight into something that's a result from your experience with it.” In other words, developed through expertise, intuition can be rephrased as an “educated inference."
Faulkner identifies four barriers to identifying and trusting a true intuitive impulse: lack of awareness in the subtleties of emotions, including those caused by uncertainty; self-imposed limitations of trying to predict market moves; acting on mistaken intuitions, or “cognitive illusions;” and finally, being driven by fear or greed.
On the other hand, a successful intuitive trader has built his confidence as a result of a developed awareness of “subtle inner signals.” Bandler and Grinder—the founders of NLP—discovered early on that these inner signals consist of thoughts that are primarily sensory in nature. In fact, all thoughts, conscious and subconscious, arise as unique combinations of an individual's five senses. Conscious thinking will utilize a person's more developed senses; meanwhile, intuitive thought uses a person's least developed senses.

Faulkner recommends that a new trader keep a dated journal of thoughts, feelings, ideas and insights related to the market. In time, the trader will notice certain patterns of how, when and where he receives intuitions. Moreover, a trader can see what happens when he follows an intuition, and—interestingly enough—what happens when he purposely makes a decision that goes counter to his intuition. Over time, having a passion for trading and diligently recording experiences will help a trader develop the awareness needed to trust those intuitive “leaps.”
However, succeeding at trading is not without its requisite legwork which, according to Faulkner, lies in five key areas: market indicators, trading strategies and money management, emotional management, successful and supportive belief systems, and a winning “metaphoric mindset.” Finally, Koppel quotes The Outer Game of Trading, in which Faulkner briefly explores the dynamics of confidence and fear.

Stocks, Futures and Options Magazine 
In April 2005, Charles Faulkner contributed to SFO Magazine an article entitled, "Inside the Counterintuitive World of Trend Followers: It's Not What You Think. It's What You Know." In this article, Faulkner examines a "trend-following philosophy" which he constructed after having observed the language patterns and behaviors of several top traders.

The counterintuitive strategy of trend followers is highlighted by seven general principles:

1. No one can predict the future
2. If you can look at "what actually is," you have a big advantage over most human beings
3. What matters can be measured, so keep refining your measurements
4. You don't need to know when something will happen to know that it will
5. Prices can only move up, down or sideways
6. Losses are a part of life
7. There is only now

Faulkner illustrates each principle by referring to the strategic mindsets of top traders such as John W. Henry, Bill Dunn, Ed Seykota, Jerry Parker, Richard Dennis, and Gerald Loeb.

Mastering High Risk Decision Making 
In Charles Faulkner's DVD, Mastering High Risk Decision Making, he presents how NLP techniques can be applied to decision making strategies within the world of trading. He examines the key traits to success shared by top traders. Specifically, successful traders know how to: separate understanding from action, attach to actions in lieu of emotions, prioritize risk management, and excel at being disciplined. Also, Faulkner shares NLP techniques that cultivate discipline, perfect goal-formulating and create a “decisive mind.

Status of NLP 
NLP is largely considered pseudoscience, something which Faulkner has recognized:

“If you want academic credibility, if you want respect from the established entities, whether they are psychological or medical or whatever, well, you have to play their game. If game sounds too flippant, then you have to meet their values. Have to meet their standards of evidence.”

Charles Faulkner was a visiting Senior Fellow at the University of Surrey in the UK for its project entitled “Neuro-Linguistic Programming and Learning,”  launched in June 2006. This research is one of the first funded NLP research projects to be conducted by a university, and it is led by Paul Tosey and Jane Mathison, the latter of whom was one of the first people ever to earn a PhD in neurolinguistic programming. Furthermore, On November 24, 2007, Faulkner presented neuroscience research at the NLP Conference in London. The session was entitled Metapatterns: The Biological Basis for How NLP Works.

Published works

See also
 Human potential movement
 Self-help

Notes

External links

External links 
 Charles Faulkner Interview
 Charles's official website

Further reading 
 
 

American motivational speakers
American motivational writers
American self-help writers
Neuro-linguistic programming writers
Life coaches
1952 births
Living people
People from St. Clair Shores, Michigan